Sergey Leonidovich Kiselyov (born 31 May 1976) is a former Russian professional football player.

Club career
He played 10 seasons in the Russian Football National League for 4 different clubs.

References

1976 births
Living people
Russian footballers
Association football defenders
FC Hämeenlinna players
FC Baltika Kaliningrad players
FC Oryol players
FC Dynamo Bryansk players
FC Lukhovitsy players
FC Lokomotiv Saint Petersburg players
FC Sever Murmansk players
Russian expatriate footballers
Expatriate footballers in Finland